Lazer Broadcasting Corp. (commonly known as Radio Lazer) is an American radio broadcasting company based in Oxnard, California. The company owns several dozen radio stations in California and a television station in Sacramento, KSTV-LD. Lazer Broadcasting stations all broadcast in Spanish, carrying several Spanish-Language formats under "Radio Lazer", "Latino", "La Mexicana" and "La Maquina Musical" branding.

Lazer Broadcasting is owned by Alfredo Placencia.

History
Radio Lazer began in 1991 in Oxnard, California with the launch of station KXLM (102.9 FM), which aired a ranchera format. The company then acquired two stations in the Inland Empire: KHYE (105.7 FM) in Hemet in February 1994, and KTOT-FM (101.7 FM) in Big Bear Lake in September 1995.

In the late 1990s, Lazer Broadcasting expanded its operations in its home market. The company purchased KXBS (96.7 FM) in November 1997, relaunching it in April 1998 as "Corazon" featuring Spanish romantic music, in contrast with its other stations' focus on traditional mariachi style music. In June 1998, Lazer added KOXR (910 AM) in Oxnard to its portfolio.

On October 30, 2008, Gold Coast Radio, owner of KMLA in Oxnard, sued Lazer Broadcasting in Ventura County Superior Court for unspecified damages. Gold Coast accused the defendant of interfering with its advertisers and customers to harm its business, beginning with the near-cancellation of a 2007 concert hosted by KMLA. Lazer filed a countercomplaint requesting an injunction to stop Gold Coast from claiming that KMLA is the number-one rated station in Ventura County, citing Arbitron ratings reports to the contrary. On November 6, a jury awarded $553,000 in damages to Gold Coast Radio and promoter Universo Musical. However, on November 20, Superior Court judge Henry Walsh agreed with Lazer's counterclaim, granting the injunction prohibiting Gold Coast from making false and misleading claims of having the top-rated station. On January 7, 2009, Walsh set aside the jury award and ordered a retrial, citing insufficient evidence presented by the plaintiffs; the second jury granted Gold Coast and Universo Musical a smaller award of $99,800 on August 28.

Lazer Broadcasting acquired its first television station in 2014, KSTV-LD in Sacramento. In October of that year, the company entered into the Sacramento and Modesto media markets when it purchased KSTV-LD and four radio stations from Adelante Media.In 2019, Radio Lazer entered the San Francisco Bay Area purchasing KSFN from Mapleton Communications.

References

External links

Radio broadcasting companies of the United States